Léo Legrand is a French actor. He is best known for playing the role of Thomas in Trouble at Timpetill and playing the role of Thomas Verniaz in A Distant Neighborhood. The latter film earned him a Young Artist Award nomination in the category of Best Young Performer.

Filmography

Film
 Tout pour plaire (2005)
 Saison (2005)
 Les Yeux bandés (2006)
 Jacquou le Croquant (2006) as Jacquou
 Trouble at Timpetill (2007) as Thomas
 La Robe du soir (2010) as Antoine
 A Distant Neighborhood (2010) as Thomas
 Mon arbre (2011)
 Cookie (2013) as Benjamin

Television
 Une famille formidable (2007)
 Adriana et moi (2007)
 Emma (2012) as Vincent
 Disparue (2014) as Romain

References

External links
 

Living people
French male film actors
French male television actors
French male child actors
Year of birth missing (living people)